Odakkuzhal is a 1975 Indian Malayalam-language film, directed by P. N. Menon and produced by M. P. Navakumar. The film stars Sheela, Jose Prakash, P. J. Antony and Alummoodan in the lead roles. The film has musical score by M. K. Arjunan.

Cast

Sheela
Jose Prakash
P. J. Antony
Alummoodan
Bahadoor
Janardanan
M. G. Soman
Rani Chandra
Master Sekhar

Soundtrack
The music was composed by M. K. Arjunan with lyrics by Vayalar.

References

External links
 

1975 films
1970s Malayalam-language films
Films directed by P. N. Menon (director)